José Quintero (born 6 November 1996) is a Venezuelan sabre fencer. He competed in the 2020 Summer Olympics.

References

1996 births
Living people
Sportspeople from Barquisimeto
Fencers at the 2020 Summer Olympics
Venezuelan male sabre fencers
Olympic fencers of Venezuela
20th-century Venezuelan people
21st-century Venezuelan people